Behlani (بهلاڻي) is a small town (Union Council) situated in Naushahro Feroze District of Sindh in Pakistan. It is located 1 km from Halani (National Highway). It has many nineteenth-century buildings, some of which still have their original architecture. It remains a source of conflict between Kalohars and  Mirs. A nearby town Mehrabpur is named for one of the brave soldiers of the Kalhoras' army, Mir Mehrab Khan Jatoi. It has poultry and fish farming, and rope made by coconut fibre used for filtering underground water supplied across Pakistan. Most of the new generation of the town has highly educated people, many of them are doctors, engineers, and teachers. A lake called "Behlani Dandh" is adjacent to the town. The town has Imam Bargahs one of them is called Imam Bargah Nangy Shah.

Population
The population of Behlani Union Council consists of around 20,000. The composition of such population is divided between the Sahita, Sehro, Malik, Mallah, Shaikh, Charan, Dobal, Arain, Bhatti, Siyal, Mughal,  Lodhi pathan, Qureshi and a few other communities. Most of these communities live in small villages nearby.

Village Sohrab Khan Unar
It is a village in Behlani UC in which a large amount of Unar community live. This village has a government school and mosque. Most of the people here are farmers and taxi drivers by profession. The coordinates of the village are

References

Populated places in Naushahro Feroze District